Apart may refer to

 "Apart" (The Cure song), by The Cure on their 1992 album Wish
 Apart (album) (1995), by Paul Schütze
 "Apart" (Brandy song), by Brandy on her 2002 album Full Moon
 Apart (2011 film), an American drama
Apart (2021 film), a documentary film
 Apart (EP), 2018 EP by Scarlett Johansson
 Apart (Léon album), 2020 album by Swedish singer Léon

See also 
 Apartness relation